When I'm President may refer to:

 When I'm President (song), a song from rock band Extreme
 When I'm President (album), an album from musician Ian Hunter